National Research Nuclear University MEPhI (Moscow Engineering Physics Institute) ( or ) is a  technical university in Russia. It was founded in 1942 as the Moscow Mechanical Institute of Munitions, but was soon renamed the Moscow Mechanical Institute. Its original mission was to train skilled personnel for the Soviet military and Soviet atomic bomb project. It was renamed the Moscow Engineering Physics Institute in 1953, which was its name until 2009.

By the Order of the Government of Russia on April 8, 2009 (#480-r) on behalf of Russian President's Decree of October 7, 2008 (#1448) "On the pilot project launching on creating National Research Universities" MEPhI was granted this new status. The university was reorganized. The aim of the university existence is now preparing the specialists by giving them higher professional, post-graduation professional, secondary professional and additional professional education, as well as educational and scientific activities.

In 2022, QS World University rankings rated the university #308 in the world, World University Rankings by Times Higher Education ranked the university #401 in the world, and U.S. News & World Report rated the university #445 in the world.

Academics
Today, MEPhI has nine main departments (faculties or institutes):

 Institute of Nuclear Physics and Engineering
 Institute for Laser and Plasma Technologies
 Institute of Engineering Physics for Biomedicine
 Institute of Nanoengineering in Electronics, Spintronics and Photonics
 Institute of Cyber Intelligence Systems
 Institute of Financial and Economic Security
 Institute of International Relations
 Faculty of Physics and Technology
 Faculty of Business Informatics and Complex Systems Management

The university offers bachelor, masters (and similar degree 'Specialist'), and post-graduate degrees in physics, mathematics, computer science and other areas. MEPhI facilities include a 2.5 MW (thermal) pool-type research reactor and Neutrino Water Detector NEVOD.  The university has about 35,000 students at branches in Moscow and other towns. In Moscow are around 7,500 students (including over 1300 foreigners). It normally takes 4 - 5.5 (some sub-departments take six) years for a student to graduate from MEPhI. The curriculum of the first two years consists exclusively of required courses (core), with emphasis on mathematics, physics, experimental work and English. After the two first years of studying students on a competition basis enroll to the sub-departments which specialize in different branches of physics, computer science, information security, mathematics, etc.

MEPhI in leading international and national university rankings

In 2022, QS World University rankings rated the university #308 in the world, World University Rankings by Times Higher Education ranked the university #401 in the world, and U.S. News & World Report rated the university #445 in the world.

Student population

The student population is predominantly male. During the first years from MEPhI's foundation there was a ban against accepting women. In recent years this situation has changed.

Location

It is a 15-minute walk (or a five-minute bus ride) from the university to the Kashirskaya station on the Zamoskvoretskaya Line of the Moscow Metro.

MOOC and other online resources 
During 2016–18 MEPhI increased its presence in online educational platforms, namely Coursera (Rus), edX  (Eng), Universarium (Rus) and CLP4NET (Eng). By the end of 2018, MEPhI had provided 43 courses via those platforms, including 25 on Coursera and 11 on edX. In 2018, the number of students that joined MEPhI's online courses on the online platforms reached approximately 160,000 persons from 150 countries.

Notable people

 Nicolay Gennadiyevich Basov - Nobel Prize
 Alexander Mikhajlovich Baldin
 Anatoly Ivanovich Larkin
 Alexander Balankin
 Igor Tamm - Nobel Prize
 Anatoly Stepanovich Dyatlov - physicist
 Igor Kurchatov  
 Lev Gor'kov
 Evgenii Feinberg 
 Yuri Oganessian - element 118 in Periodic Table named oganesson in his honor
 Isaak Pomeranchuk 
 Pavel Cherenkov - Nobel Prize
 Ilya Mikhailovich Frank - Nobel Prize
 Andrey Dmitrievich Sakharov - Nobel Prize
 Nikolay Nikolayevich Semyonov - Nobel Prize
 Lev Okun 
 Sergei Avdeyev  - engineer and cosmonaut, record for time spent in space: 747.59 days
 Vyacheslav Starshinov - Olympic champion, world champion
 Igor Irodov - author of a series of handbooks on general physics.
 Lev Artsimovich - known as "the father of the Tokamak"
 Dmitry Kholodov - Journalist who investigated corruption in the military and was assassinated on 17 October 1994
 Mukhtar Ablyazov - leader "Democratic choice of Kazakhstan", former minister of Energy, Industry and Trade in Kazakhstan (21 April 1998 – October 1999)
 Elena Vesna - psychologist and Vice-Rector of Educational Affairs.

References

External links 

 English language  and Russian language official website of National Research Nuclear University MEPhI (Moscow Engineering Physics Institute) 
 National Research Nuclear University MEPhI (Moscow Engineering Physics Institute)   Profile on the official website StudyInRussia 

 
Universities and institutes established in the Soviet Union
National research universities in Russia
Educational institutions established in 1942
1942 establishments in the Soviet Union
Nuclear research institutes in Russia
Research institutes in the Soviet Union
Nuclear technology in the Soviet Union